Onondaga Township is a civil township of Ingham County in the U.S. state of Michigan. The population was 3,158 at the 2010 census.

Communities
 Onondaga is an unincorporated community located within the township.  The Onondaga 49264 ZIP Code serves the majority of the township, as well as smaller areas in Hamlin Township to the west and Tompkins Township to the south.

Geography

Demographics
As of the census of 2000, there were 2,958 people, 993 households, and 802 families residing in the township. The racial makeup of the township was 95.44% White, 0.30% African American, 0.27% Native American, 0.03% Asian, 0.10% Pacific Islander, 1.93% from other races, and 1.93% from two or more races. Hispanic or Latino of any race were 2.94% of the population.

There were 993 households, out of which 42.3% had children under the age of 18 living with them, 68.4% were married couples living together, 8.2% had a female householder with no husband present, and 19.2% were non-families. 15.1% of all households were made up of individuals, and 4.5% had someone living alone who was 65 years of age or older.  The average household size was 2.91 and the average family size was 3.20.

In the township the population was spread out, with 30.6% under the age of 18, 6.5% from 18 to 24, 32.2% from 25 to 44, 23.6% from 45 to 64, and 7.1% who were 65 years of age or older.  The median age was 35 years. For every 100 females, there were 101.0 males.  For every 100 females age 18 and over, there were 100.4 males.

The median income for a household in the township was $52,216, and the median income for a family was $57,500. Males had a median income of $39,519 versus $28,900 for females. The per capita income for the township was $18,981.  About 5.6% of families and 9.0% of the population were below the poverty line, including 8.8% of those under age 18 and 8.1% of those age 65 or over.

References 

Townships in Michigan
Townships in Ingham County, Michigan
Lansing–East Lansing metropolitan area